The 2016–17 Basketball Champions League playoffs began on 7 February, and ended on 30 April, with the Final, which decided the champions of the 2016–17 season of the Basketball Champions League. 24 teams compete in the playoffs.

Times up to 25 March 2017 (round of 16) were CET (UTC+1), thereafter (quarter-finals and beyond) times were CEST (UTC+2).

Format
The playoffs involved the twenty four teams which qualified as winners and runners-up, of each of the four groups in the 2016–17 Basketball Champions League Regular season.

Each tie in the playoffs, apart from the Final Four games, was played with two legs, with each team playing one leg at home. The team that scored more points on aggregate, over the two legs, advanced to the next round.

The five group winners, and the three best runner-up teams, were directly qualified for the round of 16, while the other sixteen teams were drawn against each other.

For the first phase and the round of 16, teams from the same country could not be drawn against each other.

Qualified teams

Bracket

Playoffs qualifiers
The first legs were played on 7–8 February, and the second legs will be played on 21–22 February 2017.

|}

First leg

Second leg

Round of 16
The first legs will be played on 28 February–1 March, and the second legs will be played on 7–8 March 2017.

|}

First leg

Second leg

Quarterfinals
The first legs will be played on 21–22 March, and the second legs will be played on 28–29 March 2017.

|}

First leg

Second leg

Final Four

References

External links
Basketball Champions League (official website)

2016–17 Basketball Champions League
Basketball Champions League playoffs